Akçakoca is a town and district of Düzce Province, Turkey.

Akçakoca may also refer to:
 Akçakoca, Mengen, a village in the district of Mengen, Bolu Province, Turkey
 Akçakoca gas field, an offshore natural gas field on the Black Sea
 Akçakoca Poyraz G.S.K., a Turkish basketball club based in the city of Düzce

See also
 Akçakocalı, Tarsus, a small village in Tarsus district of Mersin Province, Turkey